is a Japanese footballer currently playing as a centre back for Sagan Tosu.

Career statistics

Club
.

Notes

References

External links

1998 births
Living people
Chuo University alumni
Japanese footballers
Association football defenders
Sagan Tosu players